RFA Pearleaf (A77) was a  support tanker of the Royal Fleet Auxiliary of the United Kingdom. She was the second ship to bear the name.

References

External links
 The Falklands Conflict - Data Library - Ships

1959 ships
Ships built on the River Clyde
Leaf-class tankers
Tankers of the Royal Fleet Auxiliary
Falklands War naval ships of the United Kingdom